This is a list of players who made an appearance with AS Monaco FC in no particular alphabetical order but is organised into club appearance milestones.

Key:

(*) Denotes that a stat is continuously changing and active player

Position - The players' role in a match on the pitch

Monaco - The Players time with club

Appearances - The matches that a player played in (Not to be confused with Matches started)

Goals - The total Goals scored with the club

Assists - The total Goals assisted with the club

Players

Less than 50 club Appearances

50-100 club Appearances

100-150 club Appearances

150-300 club Appearances

300+ club Appearances

References 



 
Monaco
Association football player non-biographical articles